Andaman Discoveries (AD) is a tourism social enterprise in Kuraburi, Phang Nga Province, Thailand. It is the continuation of North Andaman Tsunami Relief (NATR), a non-profit organization based in Thailand that provides assistance to tsunami-affected villages in the north Andaman Sea region. Andaman Discoveries has assumed the work of NATR, fostering long-term social, economic, and environmental sustainability and generating viable economic opportunities via training and marketing.

History
The Boxing Day Tsunami devastated many coastal villages along the Andaman coast of Thailand on December 26, 2004. The North Andaman Tsunami Relief (NATR), the parent organization of Andaman Discoveries, was formed by Bodhi Garrett in early 2005 to help villagers to rebuild their villages and livelihood. A network of volunteers and donors emerged to support the reconstruction process. NATR implemented about 120 projects in 22 communities, with the emphasis on direct cooperation with the villagers, rather than imposing what outsiders think is good for them.

Eighteen months later, Andaman Discoveries came into existence as a continuation of NATR's community development work. It started from the villagers' consideration that community based tourism could be seen as a good opportunity to generate additional income without having to give up their traditional ways of living. Training and supports were provided to the villagers while Andaman Discoveries helps to promote and facilitate cultural exchanges between villagers and tourists / volunteers.

Projects
With the help of volunteers and visitors, Andaman Discoveries has been able to organize and sustain several in-village projects using existing funds and contributions to the Community Fund. These projects include:

Sustainable Livelihoods

 Teaching English to kids, adults, guides, and host families
 Creative workshops with local children
 Hand-crafted soap and Batik cooperatives

Conservation
 Beach clearance and waste management
 Mangrove reforestation
 Wildlife and environmental conservation projects
 Orchid conservation
 Beautification of community or school gardens
 Interpretive nature trail data collection with local guides
 GPS land-use mapping

Community Development
 Construction of a community center
 Long-term scholarships
 Teacher placement in local and village schools
 Teaching community aerobics or yoga

Partners
AD's partners include research firms, educational institutions, governmental branches, and NGOs, with names such as the International Union for Conservation of Nature, Rotary International, University of California, Los Angeles, InterVol (University of Birmingham), and The Mangrove Action Project.

See also
Voluntourism
Sustainable tourism
Ecotourism
Adventure travel

References

Tourism in Thailand
Development charities
Non-profit organizations based in Thailand
2005 establishments in Thailand